Mujhse Fraaandship Karoge is a 2011 Indian Hindi romantic comedy film directed by debutante Nupur Asthana, starring debutant actors Saqib Saleem, Saba Azad, Tara D'Souza and Nishant Dahiya in the lead roles. The film is the second production of Y-Films, a subsidiary of Yash Raj Films. Loosely inspired from the 2001 Telugu film Anandam and the popular social networking site Facebook, it is written by lyricist Anvita Dutt Guptan with a screenplay by Rajesh Narasimhan, based on a story by Pooja Desai and producer Ashish Patil.

Plot
University students Vishal Bhatt (Saqib Saleem) and Preity Sen (Saba Azad) hate each other. Vishal's good looking best friend Rahul Sareen (Nishant Dahiya) is a singer and is pretty popular amongst the girls in their college. Vishal writes the lyrics for Rahul's songs but never takes any credit for it. Preity is the president of the Photography Club. Preity's good looking friend Malvika Kelkar (Tara D’Souza) is a fashion designing student. Malvika's parents live abroad leading to her stay with Preity and her mother Arunima. Rahul ignores a lot of friend requests from girls on social networking sites including Facebook and Malvika, similarly, ignores a lot of requests from guys.

Vishal likes Malvika and Preity likes Rahul. Vishal sends a friend request to Malvika through Rahul's account. Malvika, as usual, ignores the friend request (thinking Rahul is desperate because he sent her a request after only meeting once). Preity, after Malvika leaves, uses her account and accepts the friend request from Rahul. Vishal starts chatting to Malvika pretending to be Rahul. But, he is actually talking to Preity, who is pretending to be Malvika and thinking that she's talking to Rahul. Vishal and Preity are busted by their friends and they request their friends Rahul and Malvika to go on a date. 

Rahul and Malvika start liking each other after seeing that they have a lot in common. They go on a double date, Malvika with Vishal and Preity with Rahul. The college is celebrating its silver jubilee. The theme for the festival is a photographic documentary (idea of Preity) of the romantic history of the college (idea of Vishal). Vishal and Preity have to work together, sorting their differences. They have a lot in common; they are both immature and bicker a lot. Slowly, after spending time together they both sort out their differences and gradually become friends. At Rahul's birthday party, Vishal finds Rahul kissing Malvika. On seeing this, an enraged Vishal tells Malvika that it was he who had chatted on Facebook with her and not Rahul. It is soon discovered that Preity, too, has overheard the conversation. This angers her, resulting in her telling him that it was not Malvika but her who chatted with him. She admits that she had fallen in love with him but Vishal is still angry at what he considers his friend Rahul's betrayal. At the college's Silver Jubilee festival, Vishal finally realizes his mistake and tells Preity that he loves her during the event on stage ending up in them kissing, celebrating the new generation of romance.

Cast
 Saqib Saleem as Vishal Bhatt
 Saba Azad as Preity Sen
 Nishant Dahiya as Rahul Sareen
 Tara D’Souza as Malvika Kelkar
 Suparna Marwah as Arunima Sen, Preity's mother
 Prabal Panjabi as Hacky
 Manasi Rachh as Neha
 Harsh Nagar as Amit Khanna
 Chitrak Bandyopadhyay as Satyavrat "Machoman" Bandyopadhyay
 Zuha Sharma as Rashmi Patel
 Pavan Malhotra as Bhatia Ji (Gurcharan Bhatia)
 Mita Vashisht as Ms. Raghubir

Production

Development
On 1 April 2011 the film was unveiled publicly as the second production venture of Y-Films and the cast of the film met the press along with the actors from Y-Films' other venture, Luv Ka The End.

Reception

Critical response
Fullhyd.com rated it 6 out of 10, stating, "You could watch it once if you're about 18, but those who're older will have to skip it."

Soundtrack
Most of the film's music is composed by Raghu Dixit. Taran Adarsh of Bollywood Hungama gave the soundtrack three stars out of five and praised it for the variety Dixit brought in the five songs he composed. He also said the album has the kind of songs that should not be dependent upon the theatrical run of the movie and is expected to find listeners even after the movie releases.

References

External links
 
 

2011 films
2010s Hindi-language films
2011 romantic comedy films
Films set in Mumbai
Indian romantic comedy films
Films about social media
Hindi remakes of Telugu films
Films scored by Raghu Dixit